Lars Eriksson (6 February 1926 – 1 February 1994) was a Swedish footballer who played as a midfielder. He made ten appearances for the Sweden national team from 1952 to 1953. He was also part of Sweden's squad for the football tournament at the 1952 Summer Olympics, but he did not play in any matches.

References

External links
 

1926 births
1994 deaths
Swedish footballers
Association football midfielders
Sweden international footballers
Allsvenskan players
Ligue 1 players
Ligue 2 players
Degerfors IF players
FC Sète 34 players
Toulouse FC players
Grenoble Foot 38 players
Sandvikens IF players
Swedish expatriate footballers
Swedish expatriate sportspeople in France
Expatriate footballers in France